Matthew Norman Niskanen (born December 6, 1986) is an American former professional ice hockey defenseman. He played 13 seasons in the National Hockey League (NHL) with the Dallas Stars, Pittsburgh Penguins, Washington Capitals, and Philadelphia Flyers from 2007 to 2020.

He was drafted by the Stars in the first round, 28th overall, in the 2005 NHL Entry Draft. Niskanen won the Stanley Cup as a member of the Capitals in 2018.

Early life 
Niskanen played ice hockey for Virginia High School in the Minnesota State High School League from 2003 to 2005, and was on the Blue Devils' roster at their first state hockey tournament appearance in 2005. In addition to hockey, Niskanen played baseball and American football, and appeared in the state quarterfinals for the Mountain Iron-Buhl Rangers nine-man football team in 2004. He chose to commit to hockey after his high school graduation, citing it as his strongest sport.

Playing career

Amateur
Niskanen attended the University of Minnesota Duluth (UMD). At the 2005 NHL Entry Draft, he was selected in the first round, 28th overall, by the Dallas Stars.

In 2005-06, his freshman season for the Bulldogs men's ice hockey team, he recorded 14 points in 38 games. Before that, Niskanen played for the Virginia/Mountain Iron-Buhl boys' hockey team and helped bring the Blue Devils to their first state high school tournament appearance in school history. During 2006–07, his sophomore season at UMD, he scored 9 goals and 22 assists in 39 games. Niskanen was named to the 2006–07 All WCHA First Team, and the All WCHA academic Team.

Niskanen decided to leave college and turn professional after his sophomore season at UMD. On March 19, 2007, he signed an amateur tryout contract with the Iowa Stars—the Dallas Stars' American Hockey League (AHL) affiliate at the time—for the remainder of the 2006–07 season. He later signed a three-year NHL contract with the Dallas Stars which began in 2007–08. He subsequently made the Stars' 2007–08 NHL roster out of training camp.

Professional

Dallas Stars
Niskanen made his NHL regular season debut against the Colorado Avalanche on October 3, 2007 to open the 2007–08 season. He recorded his first NHL points against the Boston Bruins two nights later with two assists. His first NHL goal came on October 29, 2007, against the San Jose Sharks. Niskanen had an excellent rookie start with the Stars, leading the team in plus/minus at mid-season, which resulted in his being invited to the Young Stars game during the 2008 NHL All-Star weekend.

Pittsburgh Penguins
On February 21, 2011, Niskanen was traded (along with teammate James Neal) to the Pittsburgh Penguins in exchange for defenseman Alex Goligoski.

During the 2013–14 season, on March 4, 2014, Niskanen had his first multi-goal game with a two-goal effort in a 3–1 win over the Nashville Predators away at the Bridgestone Arena. In the final year of his contract with the Penguins and approaching free agency, Niskanen finished the season establishing new career highs in goals (10) and assists (36) for 46 points.

Washington Capitals

On July 1, 2014, Niskanen signed a seven-year, $40.25 million contract as a free agent with the Washington Capitals.

In the 2017–18 season, Niskanen continued to play top-four pairing minutes with the Capitals, posting 7 goals and 29 points in 68 games. He recorded nine points and appeared in all 24 games of the playoffs while logging over 25 minutes of ice time to help the Washington Capitals claim their first Stanley Cup.

Returning for his 12th season in the NHL in 2018–19, Niskanen contributed with 8 goals and 17 assists for 25 points in 80 regular season games for the Capitals. He posted 2 assists in 7 playoff games; the Capitals exited the playoffs with a first-round defeat to the Carolina Hurricanes.

Philadelphia Flyers
On June 14, 2019, with two-years still remaining on his contract, Niskanen was traded by the Capitals to the Philadelphia Flyers in exchange for defenceman Radko Gudas. In the 2019–20 season, Niskanen played alongside Ivan Provorov on the Flyers' top pairing and placed second among Flyers defensemen with 33 points in 68 games. On February 21, Niskanen was fined $5,000 USD, the maximum allowable under the NHL Collective Bargaining Agreement, for a slashing penalty against Columbus Blue Jackets forward Gustav Nyquist. At the time that the 2019–20 NHL season was suspended due to the COVID-19 pandemic, Niskanen had recorded 124 hits, 84 blocked shots, and eight goals.

During the 2020 Stanley Cup playoffs, Niskanen was suspended for one game for a cross-check against Montreal Canadiens winger Brendan Gallagher that fractured Gallagher's jaw. Niskanen produced one goal and one assist in 15 postseason games for Philadelphia.

With one season remaining on his contract, Niskanen announced his sudden retirement from professional hockey on October 5, 2020, at the age of 33. His agent Neil Sheehy reported that the decision resulted from uncertainty surrounding the COVID-19 pandemic and the medical protocols taken by the NHL.

International play
Niskanen has represented the United States at various international competitions at the junior and professional level. His first time representing the United States in international competition was at the 2006 World Junior Ice Hockey Championships. In 2016, he was chosen to represent the United States in the 2016 World Cup of Hockey, along with fellow Capitals John Carlson and T. J. Oshie,.

Career statistics

Regular season and playoffs

International

Awards and honors

References

External links
 

1986 births
Living people
American men's ice hockey defensemen
American people of Finnish descent
Dallas Stars draft picks
Dallas Stars players
Ice hockey players from Minnesota
Iowa Stars players
Minnesota Duluth Bulldogs men's ice hockey players
National Hockey League first-round draft picks
People from Virginia, Minnesota
Philadelphia Flyers players
Pittsburgh Penguins players
Stanley Cup champions
Washington Capitals players